Antonio Nogueira may refer to twin MMA fighters:

Antônio Rodrigo Nogueira (born 1976), retired heavyweight mixed martial artist
Antônio Rogério Nogueira (born 1976), light heavyweight mixed martial artist in the UFC